NA-232 Karachi Malir-III is a newly created a constituency for the National Assembly of Pakistan. It mainly comprises the Airport Subdivision, Malir Cantonment, and first 5 of 7 Census Circles of Faisal Cantonment. It was created in the 2018 delimitation from the bifurcation of the old NA-257.

Members of Parliament

2018-2022: NA-237 Karachi Malir-II

Election 2018 

General elections were held on 25 July 2018.

By-election 2022
A by-election was held on 16 October 2022 due to the resignation of Jamil Ahmed Khan, the previous MNA from this seat.

See also
NA-231 Karachi Malir-II
NA-233 Karachi Korangi-I

References 

Karachi